Radio Company is an American collaborative rock band formed by actor and singer-songwriter Jensen Ackles and singer-songwriter Steve Carlson. 

Their debut album Vol. 1 was released on November 8, 2019. The album peaked at 151 on the US Billboard 200, and at number 18 on the US Top Rock Albums chart.

Their second album Vol. 2 was released on May 7, 2021.

The band announced in Feb 2022, they were working on a third album. The 3rd album, titled "Keep on Ramblin'''" was released on February 22, 2023. 

They had their debut live performance in Nashville on December 19, 2022 at Analog at Hutton Hotel.

 Background 
The band was formed in 2018 in Austin, Texas, between Jensen Ackles and Steve Carlson. The two artists have been friends for years and have collaborated previously. Ackles and Carlson were originally roommates when they began writing together. In the past, the two previously wrote a song titled "Different Town" for Carlson's Rockumentary of the same name. In 2018, the two formed Radio Company in Austin and began writing their first album, Vol. 1, which was released later that fall. 

 Discography Vol. 1 (2019)Vol. 2 (2021)Keep on Ramblin' (2023)''

References

External links 
Official website

American rock music groups